Sydney Nicholls (March 1864 – 29 April 1929) was a New Zealand cricketer. He played in fifteen first-class matches for Wellington from 1882 to 1894.

See also
 List of Wellington representative cricketers

References

External links
 

1864 births
1929 deaths
New Zealand cricketers
Wellington cricketers
Cricketers from Greater London